The Cross of Saint Peter also known as Petrine Cross is an inverted Latin cross traditionally used as a Christian symbol, but in recent times also used as an anti-Christian and Satanic symbol. In Christianity, it is associated with the martyrdom of Peter the Apostle. The symbol originates from the Catholic tradition that when sentenced to death, Peter requested that his cross be upside down, as he felt unworthy of being crucified in the same manner as Jesus. The Petrine Cross is also associated with the papacy, reflecting the Catholic belief that the pope is the successor of Peter as bishop of Rome.

In Christianity

The origin of the symbol comes from the belief that Peter the Apostle was crucified upside down, as told by Origen of Alexandria. The tradition first appears in the "Martyrdom of Peter", a fragmented text found in, but possibly predating, the apocryphal Acts of Peter, which was written no later than 200 A.D. It is believed that Peter requested this form of crucifixion as he felt he was unworthy to be crucified in the same manner as Jesus.

According to Roman Catholicism, the pope is Peter's successor as bishop of Rome. Therefore, the Papacy is often represented by symbols that are also used to represent Peter, one example being the Petrine Cross.

Eugene Vintras and becoming an occult symbol 
Today, the cross of Saint Peter is also known as an occult symbol.

Vintras wore robes bearing the inverted cross. The famous French occultist Éliphas Lévi wrote that this was a sign of Vintras's satanic inclinations. 

Over time, the Petrine cross came to be known more commonly as an occult symbol. Starting with the 1960s, several TV productions and movie franchises featured the Cross of Saint Peter as a symbol representing the Antichrist and Satan making it one of the most popular satanic symbols today.

In popular culture
The inverted cross is a recurring motif in metal music, particularly in black metal in congruity with its anti-Christian themes. One well-known example is Glen Benton of the band Deicide who branded an inverted cross onto his forehead.

Former Black Sabbath drummer Bill Ward suggested that the use of an inverted cross on the inner gatefold sleeve of their debut album by their label Vertigo may have been a promotional ploy or a misunderstanding of the nature of the group. 

The Swedish metal band Ghost makes use of the inverted cross in place of the final "t" in the band's wordmark, as well as on singer Papa Emeritus I's chasuble. Also, Ghost uses an inverted cross bisecting the letter G as their logo, the Grucifix.

Many horror films use inverted crosses as part of their imagery and marketing, especially if the film involves demonic themes. Examples include The Conjuring and Paranormal Activity. At the end of Rosemary's Baby, an upside down cross hangs over the bassinet containing Satan's son.

In the Chemin de la Croix by French composer Marcel Dupré, at the part where Simon of Cyrene helps Jesus carry the cross, an inverted cross motif appears at bar 7 and then twice more before it is replaced with a pastoral theme.

Playboi Carti is known to wear two diamond encrusted pendants of the cross during his performances.

See also
Cross of Lorraine

References

External links
Saint Peter - Catholic Encyclopedia

Christian crosses
Christian symbols
Christian iconography
Saint Peter
Christian terminology
Saint Peter